The 1998–99 Divizia A was the eighty-first season of Divizia A, the top-level football league of Romania.

Teams

League table

Positions by round

Results

Top goalscorers

Champion squad

References

Liga I seasons
Romania
1998–99 in Romanian football